Matthew Kane may refer to:

 Matthew Kane (Quake 4), a character in the video game Quake 4
 Matthew Kane (actor) (born 1991), British actor
 Matthew John Kane (1863–1924), justice of the Oklahoma Supreme Court